Without a Flag (Italian: Senza bandiera) is a 1951 Italian drama film directed by Lionello De Felice and starring Massimo Serato, Paolo Stoppa and Walter Rilla.

The film's sets were designed by the art director Alfredo Montori. It was shot at Cinecittà in Rome.

Synopsis
During the First World War, an Italian officer attempts to break up an Austrian espionage ring operating out of neutral Switzerland.

Comment 
De Felice's debut film Behind the Camera was shot in the Cinecittà studios. Registered in the Public Film Register with no. 980, was presented to the Film Review Commission on 21 September 1951, obtained censorship visa n. 10,616 of 2 October 1951, with the film length of 3,098 meters. It had its first public screening in October 1951. The collection was 141,500,000 lire.

Main cast
 Vivi Gioi	as Helga Grueber
 Massimo Serato as	Leutnant Morassi
 Umberto Spadaro as Natale Papini - Lo scassinatore
 Paolo Stoppa as Poggi - Il professore
 Walter Rilla as Spionagechef
 Heinz Moog as Baron von Loetzendorff
 Carlo Ninchi as Il Comandante
 Guido Celano as Sottocapo Poggi
 Laura Solari as la signora Merrick
 Nietta Zocchi as la cameriera di Helda
 Camillo Pilotto as l'ispettore del controspionaggio
 Luigi Cimara as il diplomatico in Svizzera
 Guido Notari as l'ammiraglio
 Fanny Marchiò as una donna patronessa

References

Bibliography
 Gianni Rondolino. Dizionario del cinema italiano 1945-1969. Einaudi, 1969.

External links
 

1951 films
1950s spy films
Italian spy films
1950s Italian-language films
World War I spy films
Italian historical films
1950s historical films
Films scored by Renzo Rossellini
Italian black-and-white films
1950s Italian films